The Dushanbe Flagpole is a free–standing flagpole located in front of the Palace of Nations in Dushanbe, Tajikistan. At , it was the tallest flagpole in the world from its completion in 2011 until the 2014 erection of the  Jeddah Flagpole. It is now the third tallest flagpole in the world. It flies a  Flag of Tajikistan weighing .

Construction
The flagpole consists of 12-metre sections of steel tube fitted together by crane.

The design phase for the flagpole began in July 2009. Fabrication of the pole's sections was completed in Dubai in October 2010. The sections were then shipped to Dushanbe, where construction of the flagpole began on November 24, 2010, Tajikistan's National Flag Day. The final assembly and erection took place during April and May 2011, with the first test flight of the flag of Tajikistan taking place on May 24, 2011.

The flagpole cost $3.5 million and was part of $210 million worth of projects celebrating the 20th anniversary of Tajik independence.

References

External links
 Trident Support's page on the flagpole

Buildings and structures in Dushanbe
Flagpoles
Buildings and structures completed in 2011
Squares in Tajikistan
2011 establishments in Tajikistan